Whitefish Lake ; (Salish: epɫx̣ʷy̓u) is a natural oligotrophic freshwater lake in Flathead County, Montana, United States.

History
Whitefish Lake was named in the 1850s for the abundant mountain whitefish (Prosopium williamsoni) harvested there. The Salish referred to the lake as epɫx̣ʷy̓u, "has whitefish".

Geography
It lies between the southwest flank of the Whitefish Range and the northeast flank of Lion Mountain in Flathead County.

Tributaries to the lake include Swift Creek, which originates in Upper Whitefish Lake, and Lazy Creek, which enter at the northwestern head of the lake, and Hellroaring Creek on the eastern shore, and Beaver Creek which begins in Beaver Lake on the western shore.

Ecology
Bull trout (Salvelinus confluentus) and westslope cutthroat trout (Oncorhynchus clarki lewisi) were the apex predator and pelagic surface feeder, historically, in Whitefish Lake. They persist in the lake but in greatly diminished numbers. The primary threat to native cutthroat trout is hybridization with non-native rainbow trout (Oncorhynchus mykiss). Other native fish species include the river's namesake mountain whitefish, largescale sucker (Catostomus macrocheilus), longnose sucker (Catostomus catostomus), northern pikeminnow (Ptychocheilus oregonensis), peamouth chub (Mylocheilus caurinus,), redside shiner (Richardsonius balteatus), fathead minnow (Pimephales promelas), and mottled sculpin (Cottus bondi) slimy sculpin (Cottus cognatus), and shorthead sculpin (Cottus confusus).

The lake's fish assemblage has been almost completely disrupted by twentieth-century introductions of non-native fishes and mysis shrimp (Mysida). Introduced non-native fish species include northern pike (Esox lucius) which preys on native trout species. Kokanee salmon, the landlocked form of sockeye salmon (Oncorhynchus nerka), were introduced to the lake in 1945 and spawned successfully for 35 years until competition for forage with introduced Mysis shrimp and predation from lake trout extirpated the kokanee. The rise in Mysida populations led to an increase in non-native lake trout (Salvelinus namaycush) numbers, the latter competing with bull trout and a predator of almost every native fish species in the lake. Non-native rainbow trout (Oncorhynchus mykiss) and brook trout (Salvelinus fontinalis) have also been introduced and compete with native bull and cutthroat trout. Introduced lake whitefish (Coregonus clupeaformis) are now abundant in the lake.

Recreation
Fishing, kayaking, and boating are major recreational activities on the lake. Whitefish Lake State Park provides opportunities for camping, boating, and swimming, as does Whitefish City Beach, a sandy beach at the lake's outlet in the city of Whitefish.

See also
List of lakes in Flathead County, Montana (M-Z)
 Whitefish River
 Whitefish Lake State Park

References

External links
 Whitefish Lake Institute
 Whitefish Lake State Park website
 Whitefish City Beach website

Lakes of Montana